Juan Pablo Fernández (born 30 September 1988) is an Argentine handball player for UNLu and the Argentina men's national handball team.

He defended Argentina at the 2015 World Men's Handball Championship in Qatar.

His brother, Federico, defended Argentina at the Summer Olympics.

Individual awards and achievements
Torneo Nacional de Clubes 2016: Best left back

References

External links

1988 births
Living people
Argentine male handball players
Handball players at the 2016 Summer Olympics
Olympic handball players of Argentina
Handball players at the 2011 Pan American Games
Handball players at the 2015 Pan American Games
Pan American Games medalists in handball
Pan American Games gold medalists for Argentina
Pan American Games silver medalists for Argentina
People from Tigre, Buenos Aires
Medalists at the 2015 Pan American Games
Sportspeople from Buenos Aires Province
21st-century Argentine people